Ilya Kharun (born February 7, 2005) is a Canadian competitive swimmer who specializes in the freestyle and butterfly.

Career
Kharun was originally named to the American team for the 2022 Junior Pan Pacific Swimming Championships. However, he could not compete as he was not an American citizen.

Kharun made his international debut for Canada at the 2022 World Short Course championships. Kharun won two medals at the event, set two World Junior records and three Canadian records.

References

External links

2005 births
Living people
Canadian male swimmers
Swimmers from Montreal
Medalists at the FINA World Swimming Championships (25 m)